The Speaker of the Pyithu Hluttaw is the presiding officer or Speaker of the Pyithu Hluttaw.

Term of Office
The term of office of the Speaker of the Pyithu Hluttaw is the same as that of the Pyithu Hluttaw. However, the Speaker and the Deputy Speaker of the Hluttaw have the right to serve as the Speaker and the Deputy Speaker until the first regular session of the next Hluttaw term.

List of speakers of the House of Representatives

List of deputy speakers of House of Representatives

References

Lists of office-holders
Legislatures of Myanmar
Chairs of lower houses